Michael John Clancy (31 March 1949 – 23 February 2010) was Chief Secretary from 1997 to 2000, and later Governor and Commander-in-Chief of Saint Helena and its Dependencies (Ascension Island and Tristan da Cunha) from 2004 to 2007. He was educated at Lewis School, Pengam and Trinity College, Cambridge.

He was married to Claire Clancy who was the Chief Executive of the National Assembly for Wales between 2007 and 2017.

Death
Michael Clancy died from cancer at the age of 60.

References

1949 births
2010 deaths
British colonial governors and administrators in Africa
Governors of Saint Helena
Deaths from cancer in the United Kingdom
British people of Irish descent
Place of birth missing
Place of death missing
People educated at Lewis School, Pengam
Alumni of Trinity College, Cambridge